António Oliveira may refer to:
António Oliveira (footballer, born 1952), former Portuguese football midfielder, manager and president;
António José Conceição Oliveira, former Portuguese football forward and coach;
António Oliveira (footballer, born 1958), former Portuguese football defender;
António Oliveira (footballer, born 1961), Portuguese football coach;